Hamza Nadeem (born 31 August 1986) is a Pakistani cricketer. He made his first-class debut for Islamabad in the 2012–13 Quaid-e-Azam Trophy on 20 January 2013.

References

External links
 

1986 births
Living people
Pakistani cricketers
Islamabad cricketers
Cricketers from Rawalpindi